Bulbophyllum bracteatum, commonly known as the blotched pineapple orchid,  is a species of epiphytic or sometimes lithophytic orchid that is endemic to eastern Australia. It has crowded pseudobulbs, tough, pale green or yellowish leaves and up to twenty five cream-coloured to yellowish flowers with purplish or reddish blotches. It usually grows in the tops of rainforest trees.

Description
Flowering occurs between October and December.

Taxonomy and naming
The blotched pineapple orchid was first formally described in 1891 by Robert D. FitzGerald who gave it the name Adelopetalum bracteatum and published the description in the Journal of Botany, British and Foreign from a specimen collected near the Tweed River. In the same year, Frederick Manson Bailey changed the name to Bulbophyllum bracteatum. The specific epithet (bracteatum) is derived from the Latin word bractea, meaning "small leaf".

Distribution and habitat
Bulbophyllum bracteatum usually grows on the highest branches of rainforest trees, rarely on rock faces. It occurs between the Bunya Mountains in Queensland and the Dorrigo Plateau in New South Wales.

References 

bracteatum
Endemic orchids of Australia
Orchids of New South Wales
Orchids of Queensland
Plants described in 1891